Ilenia Pastorelli  (born 24 December 1985) is an Italian actress. In 2016, she made her film acting debut with They Call Me Jeeg, for which she was awarded the David di Donatello for Best Actress award.

Biography 
Pastorelli was born in Rome and studied there at Liceo Classico Platone. After a number of experiences working as a model, she reached notoriety in 2011 participating in Grande Fratello 12, where she was eliminated during the semi-finals.

Her cinema debut was in 2015 with Claudio Santamaria and Luca Marinelli in the film They Call Me Jeeg by Gabriele Mainetti, where she plays in the role of Alessia, a girl who suffered abuses. She was nominated to win the David di Donatello for Best Actress award in 2016, to then win the nomination.

In 2016 she appeared as the protagonist with Raoul Bova of the Biagio Antonacci's music videoclip - One day.

In 2016 she served as the anchor woman of TV program "Stracult".

In 2017 she appeared in the Laszlo Barbo film Niente di serio.

Filmography

Film

Television 
 Grande Fratello 12 (Canale 5, 2011)
 Stracult (Rai 2, 2016)

Music videos 
 One day - Biagio Antonacci (2016)
 La ballata di Hiroshi - Ilenia Pastorelli (2016)

Awards 

 David di Donatello
 2016 – Best Actress for They Call Me Jeeg (2015) - Winner
 Festival delle Cerase
 2016 - Best actress revelation for They Call Me Jeeg (2015) - Winner
 La Pellicola d'Oro
 2016 – Best actress nomination for They Call Me Jeeg (2015) - Nomination
 Globo D'oro
 2016 - Best actress nomination for They Call Me Jeeg (2015) - Nomination
 Magna Graecia Film Festival
 2016 - Monica Scattini Awards for They Call Me Jeeg (2015) - Winner
 Giornate professionali di cinema
 2016 - ANEC Carlo Zanchi Award for They Call Me Jeeg (2015) - Winner

References

External links 
 
 Ilenia Pastorelli Official Fanpage, at the Facebook, Facebook.com
 Ilenia Pastorelli Official Profile, at the Instagram, Instagram.com
 Ilenia Pastorelli Profile, at the Stefano Chiappi Management, Stefanochiappimanagement.com

1985 births
Living people
Italian film actresses
David di Donatello winners